This is a list of Independence Bowl broadcasters. The Independence Bowl is a post-season NCAA-sanctioned Division I college football bowl game that is played annually at Independence Stadium in Shreveport, Louisiana.

TV Broadcasters

Radio Broadcasters

References

Independence
Broadcasters
Independence Bowl
Independence Bowl
Independence Bowl
Independence Bowl
Independence Bowl